Gilman Park Arboretum, consisting of 14 acres (57,000 m²), is an arboretum in Pierce, Nebraska.

The Arboretum was established in 1993, and features 647 woody plants, including 243 different labeled varieties of trees and shrubs, and more than eighty different varieties of perennials and ornamental grasses. The Arboretum is sited around Bill Cox Memorial Lake, has a 1.2 mile (1.9 km) path, and the following distinct gardens: Arboretum Entrance Garden, Butterfly Garden, Historic Bridge Garden, Wildflower & Ornamental Grass Garden, and Xeriscape Garden.

External links
Gilman Park Arboretum

See also 
 List of botanical gardens in the United States

Botanical gardens in Nebraska
Arboreta in Nebraska
Protected areas of Pierce County, Nebraska